The Woodstock River Bandits are a collegiate summer baseball team in Woodstock, Virginia.  They play in the Northern division of the Valley Baseball League.

In the 2007 Valley League Baseball Playoffs, the River Bandits received the Number 8 seed, but were eliminated by the Waynesboro Generals in the first round. 2012 The River Bandits made it to the second round of the playoffs, but lost to Winchester in the second round. 2013 The River Bandits lost in the first round of the playoffs against Aldie. In 2014 The River Bandits missed the playoffs finishing 10th out of 11th in the VBL. The Bandits made the playoffs in 2015 as the #4 seed. They were eliminated in the first round of the playoffs by the  Front Royal Cardinals. In 2016, the Bandits finished at a franchise worst 11-31. The worst in the league since Rockbridge back in 2009. In 2018 Woodstock went a league history worst 5-37 finishing last in the VBL. Woodstock hires Mike Bocock to lead the team in 2019, Bocock already an inductee in the VBL Hall of Fame. In 2019, Woodstock finished the regular season with a 25-17 record, finishing 2nd in the VBL Northern division behind the Strasburg Express. The River Bandits reached the playoffs, but were knocked off in the Northern division finals by Strasburg.

External links
Woodstock River Bandits
Valley Baseball League
Woodstock River Bandits Facebook

Amateur baseball teams in Virginia
Valley Baseball League teams
Shenandoah County, Virginia
Baseball teams established in 2004
2004 establishments in Virginia